Modus Operandi is the debut studio album by British drum and bass artist Photek. It was released on 9 September 1997 on the Virgin Records sublabel Science in Europe and on Astralwerks in the US.

In 2012, Fact placed it at number 81 on its list of the "100 Best Albums of the 1990s". In 2013, Spin named it one of the 20 best Astralwerks albums.

Track listing

Charts

References

External links 
 
 
 

1997 debut albums
Photek albums
Astralwerks albums